is an EP by British musician Steven Wilson. It was released on 22 January 2016. It collects songs that were written during the sessions for Wilson's previous two studio albums, The Raven That Refused to Sing (And Other Stories) and Hand. Cannot. Erase.. The closing track is a new version of "Don't Hate Me", originally recorded by Porcupine Tree on the album Stupid Dream, sung as a duet with Israeli singer Ninet Tayeb. The title  indicates the EP serves as an interim release between Wilson's fourth solo album Hand. Cannot. Erase. and his fifth full-length studio album To the Bone.

Recording
 "My Book of Regrets" was written in late 2013 and finished in June 2015. Main recording took place from 28 June 2015 in Montreal, with additional recording at No Man's Land.
 "Year of the Plague" was written and recorded during sessions of The Raven That Refused to Sing (And Other Stories) in 2012–2013.
 "Happiness III" was written in 2003 and recorded during the Hand. Cannot. Erase. sessions at Air Studio in September 2014.
 "Sunday Rain Sets In" was recorded during the Hand. Cannot. Erase. sessions at Air Studios, East West and Spin Studios in 2014.
 "Vermillioncore" was partly written in late 2013, finished in June 2015 and recorded in October 2015.
 "Don't Hate Me" was written in 1998 and originally released by Wilson's band, Porcupine Tree, on their 1999 album Stupid Dream. This version of the track was taken from a live concert in Europe in September 2015, with additional recording at No Man's Land.

Track listing

Personnel
 Steven Wilson – lead vocals, guitars, autoharp, Mellotron, piano, percussion, virtual instruments

Guitarists
 Dave Kilminster (tracks 1 and 6)
 Guthrie Govan (track 3)

Drummers
 Craig Blundell (tracks 1, 5, and 6)
 Marco Minnemann (track 3)
 Chad Wackerman (track 4)

Additional personnel
 Nick Beggs – bass guitar, Chapman Stick, backing vocals
 Adam Holzman – Wurlitzer, Hammond organ, Minimoog, Rhodes piano
 Theo Travis – reed (tracks 4 and 6)
 Ninet Tayeb – co-vocals (track 6)

Charts

References

Steven Wilson albums
2016 EPs